The Fujifilm X-A1 is a digital rangefinder-style mirrorless camera announced by Fujifilm on September 17, 2013.

The X-A1 differs from its sister model, the X-M1 by using a conventional Bayer pattern filter on its sensor rather than the X-Trans pattern used in most other X-series cameras. As of August 2014, it is the only X-series interchangeable lens camera to do so.

Despite being the budget option, the X-A1 retains the 920k dot tilting rear screen and Wi-Fi offered by the X-M1, yet was launched with an MSRP of $599 with the XC 16-50mm F3.5-5.6 OIS standard zoom, which was $100 cheaper than the X-M1.

References

External links
Specifications

X-A1
Cameras introduced in 2013